Opio is a surname. Notable people with the surname include:
Asinisi Fina Opio (born 1986),  Ugandan biomedical scientist
Gabriel Opio (born 1945), Ugandan economist and politician
Joe Opio, Ugandan comedian and television writer
John Opio (born 1951), Ugandan boxer

Surnames of Ugandan origin